The East German national men's ice hockey team was a national ice hockey  representing the German Democratic Republic (GDR). The first international game was played in East Berlin on 28 January 1951, losing 3–8 to Team Poland.

The team competed in many international competitions, including several in which they competed with the top teams for medals, but won only the European Championship bronze medal in 1966 in Yugoslavia. The only time they competed in the Olympics was in Grenoble in 1968. They scored 13 goals in 7 games, but didn't win any games leaving them with no points in the standings. From that point on the team refused to participate in Olympic ice hockey, but participated in other tournaments where they continued to play poorly. The team ceased playing in 1990, just before the German reunification.

What would become the team's final game was played on 8 April 1990 in Megève during the B Group of the World Championship, and was lost to Team Austria, 2-3. In October 1990, Germany was re-unified.

Olympic record

1968 Winter Olympic team
Ulrich Noack
Bernd Karrenbauer
Hartmut Nickel
Helmut Novy
Wolfgang Plotka
Wilfried Sock
Dieter Purschel
Klaus Hirche
Dieter Kratzsch
Dieter Voigt
Manfred Buder
Lothar Fuchs
Peter Prusa
Joachim Ziesche
Bernd Poindl
Dietmar Peters
Bernd Hiller
Rüdiger Noack

World Championship record
1920 - 1955 - Did not participate (see German national ice hockey team)
1956 - Finished in 11th place (Won "B" Pool)
1957 - Finished in 5th place
1958 - Did not participate
1959 - Finished in 9th place
1961 - Finished in 5th place
1962 - Did not participate
1963 - Finished in 6th place
1965 - Finished in 5th place
1966 - Finished in 5th place
1967 - Finished in 7th place
1969 - Finished in 7th place (Won "B" Pool) 
1970 - Finished in 5th place
1971 - Finished in 9th place (3rd in "B" Pool) 
1972 - Finished in 9th place (3rd in "B" Pool) 
1973 - Finished in 7th place (Won "B" Pool) 
1974 - Finished in 6th place
1975 - Finished in 7th place (Won "B" Pool) 
1976 - Finished in 8th place
1977 - Finished in 9th place (Won "B" Pool) 
1978 - Finished in 8th place
1979 - Finished in 10th place (2nd in "B" Pool) 
1981 - Finished in 12th place (4th in "B" Pool)
1982 - Finished in 9th place (Won "B" Pool)
1983 - Finished in 6th place
1985 - Finished in 8th place
1986 - Finished in 11th place (3rd in "B" Pool)
1987 - Finished in 13th place (5th in "B" Pool)
1989 - Finished in 13th place (5th in "B" Pool) 
1990 - Finished in 13th place (5th in "B" Pool) 
1991 and onward - Did not participate (see German national ice hockey team)

See also
Germany men's national ice hockey team

References

External links
The Hockey Almanac's International Hockey section

 
Former national ice hockey teams
Men's national team
1951 establishments in East Germany